Martin & Roman's Weekend Best! (formerly Martin & Roman's Sunday Best!) is a British weekend breakfast programme broadcast on ITV, presented by father and son duo Martin and Roman Kemp. The series premiered in an 8:30 a.m. timeslot on 14 June 2020. The programme combines celebrity interviews (both in and out-of-studio), musical performances and games while incorporating the participation of selected home viewers via video conference.

The programme returned following its successful first series on 17 April 2021, retitled as Weekend Best! to correspond with its airing on both Saturday and Sunday mornings.

Format
Segments
In-between the celebrity guest interviews are several games in which the hosts, celebrity guests, and families participate in:
 act it out - A game of musical charades between Team Martin and Team Roman with their celebrity guests.
 cover stars - Album covers are altered with Martin and Roman's faces while the guests aim to correctly name the artist and album title.
 guess the record - Roman has guests guess the No. 1 record "on this day" from yesteryear.
 kazoo-aoke - The two host-guest pairs attempt to perform songs on kazoos while the corresponding families guess the song title or lyrics.
 lyric maestro - The two teams try to guess the correct song based on the spoken lyrics.
 memories mixtape - Guests share songs that they associate with the given memory themes.
 our best picks! - Martin, Roman, and their guests recommend their favorite shows to binge-watch on various streaming platforms, including BritBox.

Episodes 
Series 1 (as Sunday Best!)

Series 2 (as Weekend Best!)

See also
 List of television programmes broadcast by ITV

References

External links
 

2020s British television talk shows
2020 British television series debuts
Breakfast television in the United Kingdom
English-language television shows
ITV Breakfast
ITV talk shows
Television series by All3Media